Lope is an old given name of Basque, Gascon and Spanish origin, derived from Latin lupus, meaning "wolf". Lope may refer to:

Lope de Isásaga (1493–1515), Basque Spanish conquistador
Lope de Aguirre (1510s – 1561), Basque Spanish conquistador
Lope de Vega (1562–1635), Spanish poet
Lope Martín, Spanish sailor
Lope Recio Loynaz (1860-1927), Cuban general
Lupo II of Gascony (died 778)
Lope (film), a 2010 film
Lope de Vega (horse), an Irish bred Thoroughbred racehorse
Lope language, a Loloish language of China
Lopé Department, Gabon
 Lope, a type of canter and gallop in horseback riding

See also
 Lop (disambiguation)
 Lõpe (disambiguation)
 López

 Loping Airfield, a World War II United States Army Air Forces airfield China
 Luoping County, China
 Lupe (disambiguation)
 Ochoa